Imaizumi (written: 今泉) is a Japanese surname. Notable people with the surname include:

, Japanese shogi player
, Japanese video game designer
, Japanese aikidoka
, Japanese zoologist
, Japanese pop idol

Fictional characters
, a character in the manga series Yowamushi Pedal
, a character in the Touhou game Double Dealing Character

See also
Imaizumi Station, a railway station in Nagai, Yamagata Prefecture, Japan

Japanese-language surnames